The McLaren MP4-23 was a Formula One racing car that was constructed by the Vodafone McLaren Mercedes team to compete in the 2008 Formula One World Championship. The chassis was designed by Paddy Lowe, Neil Oatley, Tim Goss, Andrew Bailey and Simon Lacey, with Mario Illien and Andy Cowell designing the Mercedes-Benz engine. It was revealed at Mercedes-Benz's motor sport museum in Stuttgart on 7 January 2008, and it had its first on-track appearance at Circuito Permanente de Jerez in Spain on 9 January. The car won the 2008 World Drivers' Championship in the hands of Lewis Hamilton, but finished second in the Constructors' Championship, which was won by Scuderia Ferrari Marlboro.

Development
Following the 2007 Formula One espionage controversy the MP4-23 was subject to FIA inspection before the start of the 2008 season, to determine if any Ferrari intellectual property was on the car. After an admission that the Ferrari information was disseminated more widely throughout the team than was originally thought an apology by McLaren on 13 December 2007, and a pledge that measures would be taken to rectify the situation, caused the FIA to decide that there was no need for a formal hearing and the matter was considered closed.

As part of updated FIA regulations for the 2008 season, the MP4-23 as well as the other cars of 2008, used raised headrests in an effort to improve driver safety. The FIA had also banned traction control via the introduction of a standard ECU for 2008, making the MP4-23 the first McLaren to not use traction control since the 2001 MP4-16.

Revisions from the MP4-22 included a longer wheelbase, the removal of the "bullhorn" winglets from the airbox and a new rear wing which differed both in main profile and its endplates. In the pre-German Grand Prix testing, the car was run with a "shark fin" engine cover, as sported by cars such as the Renault R28 and the Red Bull RB4, but the team did not permanently run it.

At the 2008 Hungarian Grand Prix, some new aerodynamic parts were added, including "dumbo wings" on the nose, similar to those used by Honda on the RA108, which were temporarily removed at the Italian Grand Prix but reinstated for the rest of the season.

The MP4-23 was succeeded by the MP4-24.

Sponsorship and livery 
The livery did not differ much from that of the MP4-22: grey remained the primary colour, while red, together with the main sponsor Vodafone, appeared on both wings, on the sidepods, above the body and on the side vents. The team logo was also placed on top of the sidepods, on both sides. The other sponsors were: Johnnie Walker, SAP, Aigo, Santander, Bridgestone and Mercedes-Benz.

McLaren MP4-23K 
During the 2008-2009 off-season tests, McLaren tested a K version of its MP4-23, including a KERS and an enlarged front wing, modifications which would be used on the 2009 MP4-24.

Photos and media

Complete Formula One results
(key) (results in bold indicate pole position; results in italics indicate fastest lap)

Notes and references

External links 

McLaren MP4 23
2008 Formula One season cars
Formula One championship-winning cars